The Bandit of Tacca Del Lupo is a 1952 Italian historical drama film directed by Pietro Germi.

Plot 
In 1863 a company of Bersaglieri commanded by Captain Giordani, as part of the repression of banditry, was charged with freeing the area of Melfi, by a band whose command was an individual nicknamed Raffa Raffa, faithful to the Bourbons. Captain Giordani is determined to use the most energetic and quick means in the fight, while the Siceli commissioner, who came from Foggia to support the Bersaglieri, prefers cunning and tries to avoid the use of force. After various vicissitudes, the Bersaglieri will be able to storm Raffaele's hiding place Raffa who will be killed in a final battle by Carmine, husband of a woman named Zitamaria, who arrived on the spot in order to avenge the shame of the sexual violence suffered by his wife at the hands of the brigand.

Cast 
Amedeo Nazzari as Giordani, Bersaglieri Captain
Cosetta Greco as  Zitamaria
Saro Urzì as  Police Commissioner Francesco Siceli
Fausto Tozzi as  Lt. Magistrelli
Aldo Bufi Landi as  Lt. Righi
Vincenzo Musolino as Carmine
Oreste Romoli as Raffa Raffa
Oscar Andriani as  The General
Alfredo Bini as  De Giustino
Amedeo Trilli as  Sgt. Trilli

References

External links

1952 films
1950s historical drama films
Italian historical drama films
Films directed by Pietro Germi
Films scored by Carlo Rustichelli
Films set in Basilicata
Films set in the 19th century
Biographical films about Italian bandits
1952 drama films
Italian black-and-white films
1950s Italian films